Nuriyya Ahmadova (26 December 1950 – 10 October 2015) was an Azerbaijani actress. She was a People's Artist of the Azerbaijani republic and a presidential scholar.

Life and career
Ahmadova was born on December 26, 1950, in Baku (or, according to some sources, Sheki). She started acted at a comedy theater in 1968, but went on to the Azerbaijan State University of Culture and Arts from 1970 to 1974. In 2007, she was awarded the honorary title of People's Artist of Azerbaijan. She had two children and a grandchild throughout her lifetime. She died in Baku on 10 October 2015 following a heart attack.

References

External links
  

1950 births
2015 deaths
Actors from Baku
20th-century Azerbaijani actresses
Azerbaijani stage actresses